The East Asian Youth Games (EAYG) is a continental multi-sport event organised by the East Asian Olympic Committee (EAOC) and held every four years since 2019 among athletes from East Asian countries and territories of the Olympic Council of Asia (OCA), as well as the Pacific island of Guam, which is a member of the Oceania National Olympic Committees.

The East Asian Youth Games is currently the only Games held by East Asian Olympic Committee without special edition for disabilities (Para Games).

History

2017 East Asian Games (canceled)
The 2017 East Asian Games was scheduled to take place in Fukuoka, Japan, but was later scrapped and was scheduled to make a new event in 2019. (It was supposed to be the 2019 East Asian Youth Games, in Taichung, Chinese Taipei) before it was canceled.

2019 East Asian Youth Games (canceled)

On July 24, 2018, the East Asian Olympic Committee (EAOC) held an impromptu meeting at the request of the People's Republic of China (PRC) to revoke the hosting rights of Taichung in Taiwan, citing recent referendum movement in Taiwan to change its name from "Chinese Taipei" to "Taiwan" for 2020 Summer Olympics. The vote against Taiwan passed 6 against 1 with PRC, Hong Kong, Macau, Mongolia, North Korea and South Korea in favor, while Taiwan was against the vote, and Japan abstaining. The move by PRC is considered as politically motivated and is part of the PRC government's aggressive schemes to diminish the presence of Taiwan on the international arena.

2023 East Asian Youth Games - Ulaanbaatar, Mongolia 

The first East Asian Youth Games is scheduled to be held in Ulaanbaatar, Mongolia from 16 to 23 August 2023. Over 1,500 athletes from 9 countries and regions are expected to compete in the games.

Participating nations
All 8 countries whose National Olympic Committee is recognized by the East Asian Olympic Committee and GUM is the observer recognized by the EAOC.

1Associate member

Editions

Sports
Fifteen sports were presented in East Asian Youth Games history, including 2019 Games in Taichung.

See also

 Events of the OCA (Continental)
 Asian Games
 Asian Winter Games
 Asian Youth Games
 Asian Beach Games
 Asian Indoor and Martial Arts Games

 Events of the OCA (Subregional)
 Central Asian Games
 East Asian Games (now defunct)
 South Asian Games
 Southeast Asian Games
 West Asian Games

 Events of the APC (Continental)
 Asian Para Games
 Asian Winter Para Games
 Asian Youth Para Games
 Asian Youth Winter Para Games

 Events of the APC (Subregional)
 ASEAN Para Games

References

 
Multi-sport events in Asia
Youth sport in Asia
Youth multi-sport events
Sport in East Asia